Despite only gaining five less points than last season's title triumph, 1. FC Kaiserslautern were unable to defend their Bundesliga title and finished in fifth – still enough for a second successive season in European competition, in the UEFA Cup. Kaiserlautern also enjoyed a good run in their Champions League debut – topping a group also containing Benfica, PSV Eindhoven and HJK Helsinki and reaching the quarter-finals before being knocked out 6–0 on aggregate by fellow Germans Bayern Munich.

Players

First-team squad
Squad at end of season

Left club during season

Competitions

Bundesliga

League table

Matches

Kits

References

1. FC Kaiserslautern seasons
Kaiserslautern